Ray Dreyer Hahn (November 19, 1897 – November 8, 1989) was an American football and basketball player and coach and college athletics administrator. He served as the head football coach at the South Dakota School of Mines—now known as South Dakota School of Mines and Technology—from 1929 to 1934 and Bethany College in Lindsborg, Kansas from 1938 to 1942 and again from 1946 to 1956, compiling a career college football coaching record of 70–104–4.

Early life and playing career
Hahn was born on, November 19, 1897 in Clay Center, Kansas. He served in the United States Army during World War I.

Hahn attended Kansas State Agricultural College—now known as Kansas State University— in Manhattan, Kansas. There he participated in football, basketball, and track. He was the captain of the 1922 Kansas State Wildcats football team and was named to the Grantland Rice All-American team as a lineman.

Coaching career

Early coaching career
Hahn began his coaching career at Norton High School in Norton County, Kansas in 1923. The next year he moved on to Downers Grove High School in Downers Grove, Illinois. In 1928, he was appointed head basketball coach at Chadron Normal College—now known as Chadron State College—in Chadron, Nebraska and assistant coach in football and track under Arthur R. Stark.

South Dakota Mines
Hahn was the head football coach at the South Dakota School of Mines—now known as South Dakota School of Mines and Technology—from 1929 to 1934, compiling a record of 15–27.

Bethany
Hahn returned to coaching after a two-year absence when he was hired in 1938 as the athletic director and coach of all sports at Bethany College in Lindsborg, Kansas. He served as the head football coach at Bethany for 19 seasons between 1938 and 1956, compiling a record of 55–77–4. He took a leave of absence from 1943 to 1946 during World War II to coach and teach at Leavenworth High School in Leavenworth, Kansas. Hahn stepped down as Bethany's head football coach in 1957 and was replaced by Hal Collins. He remained Bethany's athletics director until 1966, when he was succeeded by Keith Rasmussen, the school's head football and track coach. Hahn continued as Bethany's head tennis and golf coach and as a professor of physical education.

Legacy
The Bethany College gymnasium was named the Hahn Physical Education Building in his honor. Hahn was inducted into the National Association of Intercollegiate Athletics of Fame in 1966, an organization he helped to start as the National Association of Intercollegiate Basketball, the predecessor to the NAIA.

Family and death
Hahn was married to Mildred M. Drebing on December 23, 1924, in Topeka, Kansas. He died on November 8, 1989, at Lindsborg Community Hospital.

Head coaching record

College football

References

External links
 

1897 births
1989 deaths
American football guards
American men's basketball players
Bethany Swedes athletic directors
Bethany Swedes football coaches
Bethany Swedes men's basketball coaches
Chadron State Eagles football coaches
Chadron State Eagles men's basketball coaches
Kansas State Wildcats football players
Kansas State Wildcats men's basketball players
Kansas State Wildcats men's track and field athletes
South Dakota Mines Hardrockers football coaches
South Dakota Mines Hardrockers men's basketball coaches
College golf coaches in the United States
College tennis coaches in the United States
College track and field coaches in the United States
High school football coaches in Illinois
High school football coaches in Kansas
Bethany College (Kansas) faculty
United States Army personnel of World War I
People from Clay Center, Kansas
Coaches of American football from Kansas
Players of American football from Kansas
Basketball coaches from Kansas
Basketball players from Kansas
Track and field athletes from Kansas